Ufa is a city in Russia, the capital of the Republic of Bashkortostan.

UFA or Ufa may also refer to:

Places 
Ufa (river), a river in Russia; a tributary of the Belaya
Ufa International Airport, an airport in the Republic of Bashkortostan, Russia
Ufa, Ethiopia, a town in Ginbo District of Ethiopia
Ufa Station, a railway station in Ufa

Associations and businesses 
Unified Fire Authority, a fire protection and EMS agency the Greater Salt Lake Valley, Utah
Uniformed Firefighters Association, the union of the Fire Department of New York
United Farmers of Alberta, formerly a Canadian lobby organization and political party; presently an agriculture based co-operative
UFA GmbH, Berlin, a German television and film production company
Up-Front Agency (now renamed to Up-Front Promotion), a Japanese talent agency under the umbrella of Up-Front Group

Schools 
Ursula Franklin Academy, a high school in Toronto
Utica Free Academy, a high school in Utica, New York
, French for Franco-German University

Science and mathematics 
Unambiguous finite automaton, a type of nondeterministic automaton in automata theory
Unit factor analysis, another name for dimensional analysis
Unsaturated fatty acid, a class of fatty acid nutritional compounds
Ufa (moth), a genus of moths in the family Pyralidae

Other uses 
Unrestricted free agent, a sports player without a team
Uniform Firearms Act, a set of laws in the Commonwealth of Pennsylvania